Foo Fighters: Back and Forth is a 2011 rockumentary about the American rock band Foo Fighters, directed by filmmaker James Moll. The film documents the band's history and the recording process for their seventh studio album Wasting Light. The film's title is taken from a song of the same name on Wasting Light. In 2012, Back and Forth won the Grammy Award for Best Long Form Music Video.

Background

The film includes material taken from over 1,000 hours of historical and new footage, and interviews with the current members of Foo Fighters, former bandmembers William Goldsmith and Franz Stahl, and producer Butch Vig. Frontman Dave Grohl has said the main inspiration for the film was the decision to record Wasting Light in the garage of his mansion in Encino, California – "Personally, I thought it would be a good idea to now tell the story of the last 16 years, so it would make more sense to watch us make a record in a garage. After selling out fucking stadiums and becoming this big rock band, why would you make a garage record? To me the first hour and 20 minutes of the movie is leading up to that moment." He also added that while the band "always believed a little mystery is important to rock’n’roll", he considered it was time to tell their story, and referencing the Tom Petty documentary Runnin' Down a Dream, "If we wait any longer, we’re going to wind up with a four-hour-long documentary".

Release and reception

Back and Forth saw its debut on March 15, 2011 at the SXSW festival in Austin, Texas. The first session was followed by a surprise Foo Fighters live performance, which included the entirety of Wasting Light in its setlist.

On 12 February 2012, the documentary won a Grammy Award in the Best Long Form Music Video category.

Charts

Certifications

Awards

See also
Foo Fighters: Sonic Highways

References

External links
Official website
 

2011 video albums
Foo Fighters video albums
Rockumentaries
Columbia Records video albums
Films directed by James Moll
Grammy Award for Best Long Form Music Video
Foo Fighters live albums